Rau Colony (हिंदी,राऊ कालोनी), also known as Shramik Colony (हिंदी, श्रमिक कालोनी).
Rau Colony is a residential locality in Indore, Madhya Pradesh, India.

Postal Code:453331

Elected Member of the Legislative Assembly:Anjali Kushwaha

Outlook
Rau colony is a gateway for Rau, one of the Industrial, Business and Educational Hub of the city. The आकाशवाणी tower is placed in here, and The Emerald Heights International School is situated Opposite आकाशवाणी.

The area holds a few houses and rough infrastructures. There are many small and middle shops in the area. There are many hostels for the students.

In Rau and Shramik Colony, Hindu and Muslim are live together.

Society Flats in Rau 
Currently, the area is under the hands of land lords and Zamindars of the locality. The area roughly has 200-250 houses

Storages
There are two cold storage
 Satish Cold Storage.
 Sarkari Cold Storage.
 Government warehouses.

Getting there

Bus routes 
25-
26-

Train 
Railway station is approx 2 km ahead (in Rau) of the city Indore Junction BG at (INDB)

Temple
 Shiv Mandir (शिव मंदिर).
 Ganesh Mandir (गणेश मंदिर).
 Mosque (मस्जिद).

School
 Gramin Jivan Jyoti School (run by trust).
 Government Middle School.
 Royal Public School.
 Satyam Public School.
 Madarsa (मदरसा).

Suburbs of Indore
Neighbourhoods in Indore